Events from the year 1570 in Sweden

Incumbents
 Monarch – John III

Events

 27 February - The Danes burn Växjö. 
 - The deposed King and his family is brought to Åbo Castle.
 21 August - The Livonian war is resumed. 
 13 December – The Northern Seven Years' War  is terminated by the Treaty of Stettin (1570).
 - A set of rules for the Swedish fleet is issued.

Births

 31 August - Gustav of Saxe-Lauenburg, prince  (died 1597) 
 
 
 

 - Ebba Bielke, baroness sentenced for high treason  (died 1618)

Deaths

References

 
Years of the 16th century in Sweden
Sweden